Odo III may refer to:

 Odo III, Count of Troyes (983–1037)
 Odo III of Beauvais (died 1148), bishop
 Odo III, Duke of Burgundy (1166–1218)